Donna Koniel (born 20 August 1992) is an athlete from Papua New Guinea competing primarily in the 400 and 800 metres. She represented her country at the 2015 World Championships in Beijing without advancing from the first round.

In 2019, at the 2019 Pacific Games held in Samoa, she won the silver medal in the women's 800 metres event.

Competition record

Personal bests
Outdoor
200 metres – 25.58 (+0.5 m/s, Brisbane 2015)
400 metres – 54.29 (Port Moresby 2015)
800 metres – 2:08.77 (Gold Coast 2015)
400 metres hurdles – 58.28 (Port Moresby 2015)

References

All-Athletics profile

Living people
1992 births
People from East New Britain Province
Papua New Guinean female sprinters
Papua New Guinean female middle-distance runners
Papua New Guinean female hurdlers
World Athletics Championships athletes for Papua New Guinea
Commonwealth Games competitors for Papua New Guinea
Athletes (track and field) at the 2014 Commonwealth Games